Passion: Let the Future Begin is a live album recorded at the 2013 Passion Conference with more than 60,000 university-aged students in Atlanta, Georgia. This collection of new songs features sixstepsrecords artists Chris Tomlin, David Crowder, Charlie Hall, Matt Redman, Christy Nockels, and Kristian Stanfill, and other special guests. The album was released by Passion on March 12, 2013. On March 30, 2013, the album charted on the Billboard 200 and the Christian Albums charts, which it was charted at Nos. 4 and 1 respectively.

Track listing

Charts

References

2013 live albums
Passion Conferences albums